This is a complete  list of works by H. P. Lovecraft. Dates for the fiction, collaborations and juvenilia are in the format: composition date / first publication date, taken from An H. P. Lovecraft Encyclopedia by S. T. Joshi and D. E. Schultz, Hippocampus Press, New York, 2001. For other sections, dates are the time of composition, not publication. Many of these works can be found on Wikisource.

Fiction
{| class="wikitable sortable" border="1"
|-
!Sl. No.
! Title
! Date written
! Date published
! Form
|-
|1
|  
|  
|  
|  Short story
|-
|2
|  
|  
|  
|  Short story
|-
|3
| "Dagon"
|  
|  
|  Short story
|-
|4
|  
|  
|  
|  Short story
|-
|5
| "Polaris"
|  
|  
|  Short story
|-
|6
| "Beyond the Wall of Sleep"
|  
|  
|  Short story
|-
|7
| "Memory"
|  
|  
|  Flash fiction
|-
|8
|  "Old Bugs"
|  
|  
|  Short story
|-
|9
|  
|  
|  
|  Short story
|-
|10
|  
|  
|  
|  Short story
|-
|11
|  
|  
|  
|  Short story
|-
|12
|  
|  
|  
|  Short story
|-
|13
|  
|  
|  
|  Short story
|-
|14
|  
|  
|  
|  Short story
|-
|15
|  
|  
|  
|  Short story
|-
|16
|  
|  
|  
|  Short story
|-
|17
|  "Celephaïs"
|  
|  
|  Short story
|-
|18
|  "From Beyond"
|  
|  
|  Short story
|-
|19
|  
|  
|  
|  Short story
|-
|20
|  "Nyarlathotep"
|  
|  
|  Short story
|-
|21
|  
|  
|  
|  Short story
|-
|22
|  "Facts Concerning the Late Arthur Jermyn and His Family"
|  
|  
|  Short story
|-
|23
|  
|  
|  
|  Short story
|-
|24
|  
|  
|  
|  Short story
|-
|25
|  
|  
|  
|  Short story
|-
|26
|  "Ex Oblivione"
|  
|  
|  Short story
|-
|27
|  
|  
|  
|  Short story
|-
|28
|  
|  
|  
|  Short story
|-
|29
|  
|  
|  
|  Short story
|-
|30
|  "Sweet Ermengarde"
|  
|  
|  Short story
|-
|31
|  "Hypnos"
|  
|  
|  Short story
|-
|32
|  "What the Moon Brings"
|  
|  
|  Short story
|-
|33
|  "Azathoth"
|  
|  
|  Novel fragment
|-
|34
|  "Herbert West–Reanimator"
|  
|  
|  Short story
|-
|35
|  
|  
|  
|  Short story
|-
|36
|  
|  
|  
|  Short story
|-
|37
|  
|  
|  
|  Short story
|-
|38
|  
|  
|  
|  Short story
|-
|39
|  
|  
|  
|  Short story
|-
|40
|  
|  
|  
|  Short story
|-
|41
|  
|  
|  
|  Short story
|-
|42
|  "He"
|  
|  
|  Short story
|-
|43
|  "In the Vault"
|  
|  
|  Short story
|-
|44
|  "Cool Air"
|  
|  
|  Short story
|-
|45
|  
|  
|  
|  Short story
|-
|46
|  "Pickman's Model"
|  
|  
|  Short story
|-
|47
|  
|  
|  
|  Short story
|-
|48
|  
|  
|  
|  Short story
|-
|49
|  
|  
|  
|  Novella
|-
|50
|  
|  
|  
|  Novel
|-
|51
|  
|  
|  
|  Short story
|-
|52
|  
|  
|  
|  Short story fragment
|-
|53
|  
|  
|  
|  Letter excerpt
|-
|54
|  "History of the Necronomicon"
|  
|  
|  Brief pseudo-history
|-
|55
|  
|  
|  
|  Novella 
|-
|56
|  "Ibid"
|  
|  
|  Short story
|-
|57
|  
|  
|  
|  Novella
|-
|58
|  At the Mountains of Madness
|  
|  
|  Novella
|-
|59
|  The Shadow over Innsmouth
|  
|  
|  Novella
|-
|60
|  
|  
|  
|  Short story
|-
|61
|  
|  
|  
|  Short story
|-
|62
|  
|  
|  
|  Short story fragment
|-
|63
|  
|  
|  
|  Letter excerpt
|-
|64
|  
|  
|  
|  Novella
|-
|65
|  
|  
|  
|  Short story
|}

Collaborations, revisions, and ghost writing

Works by August Derleth related to H. P. Lovecraft's works and notes

While put forward as posthumous collaborations while Derleth was alive, the status of these works as collaborations with Lovecraft  was swiftly disputed after his death. Subsequent critics consider them part of the Cthulhu Mythos, but often split this into the original "Lovecraft Mythos" and the later and lesser "Derleth Mythos".

Unknown authorship
 "The Inevitable Conflict". This was published in Amazing Stories (December 1930 and January 1931) under the name Paul  H. Lovering. A variety of evidence, including statistical analysis of the writing structure, has been put forward to suggest that Lovecraft was not the author.

Juvenilia

Poetry

Lovecraft's complete poetry is collected in S.T. Joshi (ed), The Ancient Track: Complete Poetical Works of H. P. Lovecraft (NY: Hippocampus Press, 2013. (An earlier, less complete version was published by Night Shade Books in 2001).

 The Poem of Ulysses, or The Odyssey [November 8, 1897]
 Ovid's Metamorphoses [1898–1902]
 H. Lovecraft's Attempted Journey betwixt Providence & Fall River on the N.Y.N.H. & H.R.R. [1901]
 Poemata Minora, Volume II [1902]
 Ode to Selene or Diana
 To the Old Pagan Religion
 On the Ruin of Rome
 To Pan
 On the Vanity of Human Ambition
 C.S.A. 1861–1865: To the Starry Cross of the SOUTH [1902]
 De Triumpho Naturae [July 1905]
 The Members of the Men's Club of the First Universalist Church of Providence, R.I., to Its President, About to Leave for Florida on Account of His Health [c. 1908–12]
 To His Mother on Thanksgiving [November 30, 1911]
 To Mr. Terhune, on His Historical Fiction [c. 1911–13]
 Providence in 2000 A.D. [March 4, 1912]
 New-England Fallen [April 1912]
 On the Creation of Niggers [1912]
 Fragment on Whitman [c. 1912]
 On Robert Browning [c. 1912]
 On a New-England Village Seen by Moonlight [September 7, 1913]
 Quinsnicket Park [1913]
 To Mr. Munroe, on His Instructive and Entertaining Account of Switzerland [January 1, 1914]
 Ad Criticos [January–May? 1914]
 Frusta Praemunitus [June? 1914]
 De Scriptore Mulieroso [June? 1914]
 To General Villa [Summer 1914]
 On a Modern Lothario [July–August 1914]
 The End of the Jackson War [October 1914]
 To the Members of the Pin-Feathers on the Merits of Their Organisation, and of Their New Publication, The Pinfeather [November 1914]
 To the Rev. James Pyke [November 1914]
 To an Accomplished Young Gentlewoman on Her Birthday, Decr. 2, 1914 [December 2? 1914]
 Regner Lodbrog's Epicedium [c. December 1914]
 The Power of Wine: A Satire [c. December 8, 1914]
 The Teuton's Battle-Song [c. December 17, 1914]
 New England [December 18, 1914]
 Gryphus in Asinum Mutatus [1914?]
 To the Members of the United Amateur Press Association from the Providence Amateur Press Club [c. January 1, 1915]
 March [March 1915]
 1914 [March 1915]
 The Simple Speller's Tale [April 1915]
 On Slang [April 1915]
 An Elegy on Franklin Chase Clark, M.D. [April 29, 1915]
 The Bay-Stater's Policy [June 1915]
 The Crime of Crimes [July 1915]
 Ye Ballade of Patrick von Flynn [c. August 23, 1915]
 The Issacsonio-Mortoniad [c. September 14, 1915]
 On Receiving a Picture of Swans [c. September 14, 1915]
 Unda; or, The Bride of the Sea [c. September 30, 1915]
 On "Unda; or, The Bride of the Sea" [c. September 30, 1915]
 To Charlie of the Comics [c. September 30, 1915]
 Gems from in a Minor Key [October 1915]
 The State of Poetry [October 1915]
 The Magazine Poet [October 1915]
 A Mississippi Autumn [December 1915]
 On the Cowboys of the West [December 1915]
 To Samuel Loveman, Esquire, on His Poetry and Drama, Written in the Elizabethan Style [December 1915]
 An American to Mother England [January 1916]
 The Bookstall [January 1916]
 A Rural Summer Eve [January 1916]
 To the Late John H. Fowler, Esq. [March 1916]
 R. Kleiner, Laureatus, in Heliconem [April 1916]
 Temperance Song [Spring 1916]
 Lines on Gen. Robert Edward Lee [c. May 18, 1916]
 Content [June 1916]
 My Lost Love [c. June 10, 1916]
 The Beauties of Peace [June 27, 1916]
 The Smile [July 1916]
 Epitaph on ye Letterr Rrr........ [August 29, 1916]
 The Dead Bookworm [c. August 29, 1916]
 On Phillips Gamwell [September 1, 1916]
 Inspiration [October 1916]
 Respite [October 1916]
 The Rose of England [October 1916]
 The Unknown [October 1916]
 Ad Balneum [c. October 1916]
 On Kelso the Poet [October? 1916]
 Providence Amateur Press Club (Deceased) to the Athenaeum Club of Journalism [November 24, 1916]
 Brotherhood [December 1916]
 Brumalia [December 1916]
 The Poe-et's Nightmare [1916]
 Futurist Art [January 1917]
 On Receiving a Picture of the Marshes of Ipswich [January 1917]
 The Rutted Road [January 1917]
 An Elegy on Phillips Gamwell, Esq. [January 5, 1917]
 Lines on Graduation from the R.I. Hospital's School of Nurses [c. January 13, 1917]
 Fact and Fancy [February 1917]
 The Nymph's Reply to the Modern Business Man [February 1917]
 Pacifist War Song—1917 [March 1917]
 Percival Lowell [March 1917]
 To Mr. Lockhart, on His Poetry [March 1917]
 Britannia Victura [April 1917]
 Spring [April 1917]
 A Garden [April 1917]
 Sonnet on Myself [April 1917]
 April [April 24, 1917]
 Iterum Conjunctae [May 1917]
 The Peace Advocate [May 1917]
 To Greece, 1917 [May? 1917]
 On Receiving a Picture of ye Towne of Templeton, in the Colonie of Massachusetts-Bay, with Mount Monadnock, in New-Hampshire, Shown in the Distance [June 1917]
 The Poet of Passion [June 1917]
 Earth and Sky [July 1917]
 Ode for July Fourth, 1917 [July 1917]
 On the Death of a Rhyming Critic [July 1917]
 Prologue to "Fragments from an Hour of Inspiration" by Jonathan E. Hoag [July 1917]
 To M.W.M. [July 1917]
 To the Incomparable Clorinda [July 1917]
 To Saccharissa, Fairest of Her Sex [July 1917]
 To Rhodoclia—Peerless among Maidens [July 1917]
 To Belinda, Favourite of the Graces [July 1917]
 To Heliodora—Sister of Cytheraea [July 1917]
 To Mistress Sophia Simple, Queen of the Cinema [August 1917]
 An American to the British Flag [November 1917]
 Autumn [November 1917]
 Nemesis [November 1, 1917]
 Astrophobos [c. November 25, 1917]
 Lines on the 25th. Anniversary of the Providence Evening News, 1892–1917 [December 1917]
 Sunset [December 1917]
 Old Christmas [late 1917]
 To the Arcadian [late 1917]
 To the Nurses of the Red Cross [1917]
 The Introduction [1917?]
 A Summer Sunset and Evening [1917?]
 A Winter Wish [January 2, 1918]
 Laeta; a Lament [February 1918]
 To Jonathan E. Hoag, Esq. [February 1918]
 The Volunteer [February 1918]
 Ad Britannos—1918 [April 1918]
 Ver Rusticum [April 1, 1918]
 To Mr. Kleiner, on Receiving from Him the Poetical Works of Addison, Gay, and Somerville [April 10, 1918]
 A Pastoral Tragedy of Appleton, Wisconsin [c. May 27, 1918]
 On a Battlefield in Picardy [May 30, 1918]
 Psychopompos: A Tale in Rhyme [late 1917-summer 1918]
 A June Afternoon [June 1918]
 The Spirit of Summer [June 27, 1918]
 Grace [July 1918]
 The Link [July 1918]
 To Alan Seeger [July 1918]
 August [August 1918]
 Damon and Delia, a Pastoral [August 1918]
 Phaeton [August 1918]
 To Arthur Goodenough, Esq. [August 20, 1918]
 Hellas [September 1918]
 To Delia, Avoiding Damon [September 1918]
 Alfredo; a Tragedy [September 14, 1918]
 The Eidolon [October 1918]
 Monos: An Ode [October 1918]
 Germania—1918 [November 1918]
 To Col. Linkaby Didd [November 1, 1918]
 Ambition [December 1918]
 A Cycle of Verse [November–December 1918]
 Oceanus
 Clouds
 Mother Earth
 To the Eighth of November [December 13, 1918]
 To the A.H.S.P.C., on Receipt of the Christmas Pippin [December? 1918]
 The Conscript [1918?]
 Greetings [January 1919]
 Theodore Roosevelt [January 1919]
 To Maj.-Gen. Omar Bundy, U.S.A. [January 1919]
 To Jonathan Hoag, Esq. [February 1919]
 Despair [c. February 19, 1919]
 In Memoriam: J.E.T.D. [March 1919]
 Revelation [March 1919]
 April Dawn [April 10, 1919]
 Amissa Minerva [May 1919]
 Damon: A Monody [May 1919]
 Hylas and Myrrha: A Tale [May 1919]
 North and South Britons [May 1919]
 To the A.H.S.P.C., on Receipt of the May Pippin [May? 1919]
 Helene Hoffman Cole: 1893–1919 [June 1919]
 John Oldham: A Defence [June 1919]
 On Prohibition [June 30, 1919]
 Myrrha and Strephon [July 1919]
 The House [c. July 16, 1919]
 Monody on the Late King Alcohol [August 1919]
 The Pensive Swain [October 1919]
 The City [October 1919]
 Oct 17, 1919 [October 1919]
 On Collaboration [October 20, 1919]
 To Edward John Moreton Drax Plunkett, Eighteenth Baron Dunsany [November 1919]
 Wisdom [November 1919]
 Birthday Lines to Margfred Galbraham [November 1919]
 The Nightmare Lake [December 1919]
 Bells [December 11, 1919]
 January [January 1920]
 To Phillis [January 1920]
 Tryout's Lament for the Vanished Spider [January 1920]
 Ad Scribam [February 1920]
 On Reading Lord Dunsany's Book of Wonder [March 1920]
 To a Dreamer [April 25, 1920]
 Cindy: Scrub Lady in a State Street Skyscraper [June 1920]
 The Poet's Rash Excuse [July 1920]
 With a Copy of Wilde's Fairy Tales [July 1920]
 Ex-Poet's Reply [July? 1920]
 To Two Epgephi [July? 1920]
 On Religion [August 1920]
 The Voice [August 1920]
 On a Grecian Colonnade in a Park [August 20, 1920]
 The Dream [September 1920]
 October 1 [October 1920]
 To S.S.L.—Oct 17, 1920 [October 1920]
 Christmas [November 1920]
 To Alfred Galpin, Esq. [November? 1920]
 Theobaldian Aestivation [November 11, 1920]
 S.S.L.: Christmas 1920 [December? 1920]
 On Receiving a Portraiture of Mrs. Berkeley, ye Poetess [December 25, 1920]
 The Prophecy of Capys Secundus [January 11, 1921]
 To a Youth [February 1921]
 To Mr. Hoag [February 1921]
 The Pathetick History of Sir Wilful Wildrake [Spring? 1921]
 On the Return of Maurice Winter Moe, Esq., to the Pedagogical Profession [June 1921]
 Medusa: A Portrait [November 29, 1921]
 To Mr. Galpin [December 1921]
 Sir Thomas Tryout [December 1921]
 On a Poet's Ninety-first Birthday [February 10, 1922]
 Simplicity: A Poem [c. May 18, 1922]
 To Saml: Loveman, Gent. [Summer? 1922]
 Plaster-All [August? 1922]
 To Zara [August 31, 1922]
 To Damon [November? 1922]
 Waste Paper [late 1922? early 1923?]
 To Rheinhart Kleiner, Esq. [January 1923]
 Chloris and Damon [January 1923]
 To Mr. Hoag [February? 1923]
 To Endymion [April? 1923]
 The Feast [May 1923]
 On Marblehead [July 10, 1923]
 To Mr. Baldwin, on Receiving a Picture of Him in a Rural Bower [September 29, 1923]
 Lines for Poets' Night at the Scribblers' Club [October? 1923]
 On a Scene in Rural Rhode Island [November 8, 1923]
 Damon and Lycë [December 13, 1923]
 To Mr. Hoag [c. February 3, 1924]
 On the Pyramids [c. February 1924]
 Stanzas on Samarkand I-III [February–March 1924]
 Providence [September 26, 1924]
 On The Thing in the Woods by Harper Williams [c. November 29, 1924]
 Solstice [December 25, 1924]
 To Saml Loveman, Esq. [c. January 14, 1925]
 To George Kirk, Esq. [January 18, 1925]
 My Favourite Character [January 31, 1925]
 On the Double-R Coffee House [February 1, 1925]
 To Mr. Hoag [c. February 10, 1925]
 The Cats [February 15, 1925]
 On Rheinhart Kleiner Being Hit by an Automobile [c. February 16, 1925]
 To Xanthippe, on Her Birthday—March 16, 1925 [March 1925]
 Primavera [April 1925]
 To Frank Belknap Long on His Birthday [April? 1925]
 A Year Off [July 24, 1925]
 To an Infant [August 26, 1925]
 On a Politician [c. October 24–27, 1925]
 On a Room for Rent [c. October 24–27, 1925]
 October 2 [October 30, 1925]
 To George Willard Kirk, Gent., of Chelsea-Village, in New-York, upon His Birthday, Novr. 25, 1925 [November 24, 1925]
 On Old Grimes by Albert Gorton Greene [December 1925]
 Festival [December 1925]
 To Jonathan Hoag [February 10, 1926]
 Hallowe'en in a Suburb [March 1926]
 In Memoriam: Oscar Incoul Verelst of Manhattan: 1920–1926 [c. June 28, 1926]
 The Return [December 1926]
 Εις Σφιγγην [December 1926]
 Hedone [January 3, 1927]
 To Miss Beryl Hoyt [February 1927]
 To Jonathan E. Hoag, Esq. [February? 1927]
 On J.F. Roy Erford [June 18, 1927]
 On Ambrose Bierce [c. June 1927]
 On Cheating the Post Office [c. August 14, 1927]
 On Newport, Rhode Island [September 17, 1927]
 The Absent Leader [October 12, 1927]
 Ave atque Vale [October 18, 1927]
 To a Sophisticated Young Gentleman [December 15, 1928]
 The Wood [January 1929]
 An Epistle to the Rt. Honble Maurce Winter Moe, Esq. [July 1929]
 Stanzas on Samarkand IV [November 8, 1929]
 Lines upon the Magnates of the Pulp [November 1929]
 The Outpost [November 26, 1929]
 The Ancient Track [November 26, 1929]
 The Messenger [November 30, 1929]
 The East India Brick Row [December 12, 1929]
 The Fungi From Yuggoth [December 27, 1929 – 4 January 30]
 I. The Book
 II. Pursuit
 III. The Key
 IV. Recognition
 V. Homecoming
 VI. The Lamp
 VII. Zaman's Hill
 VIII. The Port
 IX. The Courtyard
 X. The Pigeon-Flyers
 XI. The Well
 XII. The Howler
 XIII. Hesperia
 XIV. Star-Winds
 XV. Antarktos
 XVI. The Window
 XVII. A Memory
 XVIII. The Gardens of Yin
 XIX. The Bells
 XX. Night-Gaunts
 XXI. Nyarlathotep
 XXII. Azathoth
 XXIII. Mirage
 XXIV. The Canal
 XXV. St. Toad's
 XXVI. The Familiars
 XXVII. The Elder Pharos
 XXVIII. Expectancy
 XXIX. Nostalgia
 XXX. Background
 XXXI. The Dweller
 XXXII. Alienation
 XXXIII. Harbour Whistles
 XXXIV. Recapture [November 1929]
 XXXV. Evening Star
 XXXVI. Continuity
 Veteropinguis Redivivus [Summer 1930?]
 To a Young Poet in Dunedin [c. May 29, 1931]
 FUNGI from YUGGOTH, 6.Nyarlathotep and 7. Azathoth. Verses printed in Jan. 1931 WEIRD TALES.
 On an Unspoil'd Rural Prospect [August 30, 1931]
 Bouts Rimés [May 23, 1934]
 Beyond Zimbabwe
 The White Elephant
 Anthem of the Kappa Alpha Tau [c. August 7, 1934]
 Edith Miniter [September 10, 1934]
 Little Sam Perkins [c. September 17, 1934]
 Metrical Example [February 27, 1935]
 Dead Passion's Flame [Summer 1935]
 Arcadia [Summer 1935]
 Lullaby for the Dionne Quintuplets [Summer 1935]
 The Odes of Horace: Book III, IX [January 22, 1936]
 In a Sequester'd Providence Churchyard Where Once Poe Walk'd [August 8, 1936]
 To Mr. Finlay, upon His Drawing for Mr. Bloch's Tale, "The Faceless God" [c. November 30, 1936]
 To Clark Ashton Smith, Esq., upon His Phantastick Tales, Verses, Pictures, and Sculptures [c. December 11, 1936]
 The Decline and Fall of a Man of the World [n.d.]
 Epigrams [n.d.]
 Gaudeamus [n.d.]
 The Greatest Law [n.d.]
 Life's Mystery [n.d.]
 On Mr. L. Phillips Howard's Profound Poem Entitled "Life's Mystery" [n.d.]
 Nathicana [n.d.]
 On an Accomplished Young Linguist [n.d.]
 "The Poetical Punch" Pushed from His Pedestal [n.d.]
 The Road to Ruin [n.d.]
 Saturnalia [n.d.]
 Sonnet Study [n.d.]
 Sors Poetae [n.d.]
 To Samuel Loveman, Esq. [n.d.]
 To "The Scribblers" [n.d.]
 Verses Designed to Be Sent by a Friend of the Author to His Brother-in-Law on New Year's Day [n.d.]
 Christmas Greetings [n.d.]
 To Eugene B. Kuntz, et al.
 To Laurie A. Sawyer
 To Sonia H. Greene
 To Rheinhart Kleiner
 To Felis
 To Annie E.P. Gamwell
 To Felis

Philosophical works

Scientific works

 The Art of Fusion, Melting Pudling & Casting (1899)
 Chemistry, 4 volumes (1899)
 A Good Anaesthetic (1899)
 The Railroad Review (1901)
 The Moon (1903)
 The Scientific Gazette (1903–04)
 Astronomy/The Monthly Almanack (1903–04)
 The Rhode Island Journal of Astronomy (1903–07)
 Annals of the Providence Observatory (1904)
 Providence Observatory Forecast (1904)
 The Science Library, 3 volumes (1904)
 Astronomy articles for The Pawtuxet Valley Gleaner (1906)
 Astronomy articles for The Providence Tribune (1906–08)
 Third Annual Report of the Providence Meteorological Station (1906)
 Celestial Objects for All (1907)
 Astronomical Notebook (1909–15)
 Astronomy articles for The Providence Evening News (1914–18)
 "Bickerstaffe" articles from The Providence Evening News (1914)
 "Science versus Charlatanry" (September 9, 1914)
 "The Falsity of Astrology" (October 10, 1914)
 "Astrology and the Future" (October 13, 1914)
 "Delavan's Comet and Astrology" (October 26, 1914)
 "The Fall of Astrology" (December 17, 1914)
 Astronomy articles for The Asheville Gazette-News (1915)
 Editor's Note to MacManus' "The Irish and the Fairies" (1916)
 The Truth about Mars (1917)

Miscellaneous writings

Reprintings and collections
The following are modern reprintings and collections of Lovecraft's work. This list includes only editions by select publishers; therefore, this list is not exhaustive:
 From Arkham House
 with corrected texts by S. T. Joshi:
 At the Mountains of Madness and Other Novels (7th corrected printing), S. T. Joshi (ed.), 1985. 
 Dagon and Other Macabre Tales, S. T. Joshi (ed.), 1987.
 The Dunwich Horror and Others (9th corrected printing), S. T. Joshi (ed.), 1984.
 The Horror in the Museum and Other Revisions, S.T. Joshi (ed.), 1989.
 Miscellaneous Writings
 From Arktos
 The Conservative: The Complete Issues 1915–1923
 From Ballantine/Del Rey:
 The Tomb and Other Tales
 Tales of the Cthulhu Mythos
 The Doom That Came to Sarnath and Other Stories
 The Lurking Fear and Other Stories
 The Dream-Quest of Unknown Kadath
 The Case of Charles Dexter Ward
 At the Mountains of Madness and Other Tales of Terror
 The Best of H. P. Lovecraft: Bloodcurdling Tales of Horror and the Macabre
 The Transition of H. P. Lovecraft: The Road to Madness
 The Dream Cycle of H. P. Lovecraft: Dreams of Terror and Death
 Waking Up Screaming: Haunting Tales of Terror
 Pickman's Model By H.P. Lovecraft First Published in "Weird Tales" in 1927
 From Barnes & Noble:
 H.P. Lovecraft: The Complete Fiction (Barnes & Noble Leatherbound Classics Series)
 From Classic CD Books:
 Early Horror Works
 More Early Horror Works
 From Donald M. Grant, publisher, Inc.:
 To Quebec and the Stars
 From Ecco Press:
 Tales of H.P. Lovecraft (with an introduction by Joyce Carol Oates)
 From Gollancz:
 Necronomicon: The Best Weird Tales of H.P. Lovecraft: Commemorative Edition (edited with an afterword by Stephen Jones)  Cased; 978-0-575081-574 Export trade paperback.
 From HarperCollins:
 Omnibus 1: At the Mountains of Madness
 Omnibus 2: Dagon and other Macabre Tales
 Omnibus 3: The Haunter of the Dark
 From Hippocampus Press:
 The Shadow out of Time
 From the Pest Zone: The New York Stories
 The Annotated Fungi From Yuggoth
 Collected Essays
 Volume 1. Amateur Journalism
 Volume 2. Literary Criticism
 Volume 3. Science
 Volume 4. Travel
 Volume 5: Philosophy; Autobiography and Miscellany (December 2006)
 CD-ROM (2007)
 The Annotated Supernatural Horror in Literature
 H. P. Lovecraft: Letters to Alfred Galpin
 H. P. Lovecraft: Letters To Rheinhart Kleiner
 H. P. Lovecraft: Letters to Robert Bloch and Others
 H. P. Lovecraft: Letters to Elizabeth Toldridge & Anne Tillery Renshaw
 H. P. Lovecraft: Letters To James F. Morton
 H. P. Lovecraft: Letters to J. Vernon Shea and Others
 H. P. Lovecraft: Letters to Duane W. Rimel and Others
 Essential Solitude: The Letters of H. P. Lovecraft and August Derleth: 1926–1931
 The Ancient Track: The Complete Poetical Works of H. P. Lovecraft. This 2013 revised edition supersedes the 2001 edition from Night Shade Books, with around twelve additional poems or fragments included.
 From The Library of America
 H. P. Lovecraft: Tales (Peter Straub, editor)
 From Morrow:
 Great Ghost Stories (1998) (Compiled by Peter Glassman, Illustrated by Barry Moser)
 From Night Shade Books:
 The Ancient Track: The Complete Poetical Works of H. P. Lovecraft
 Mysteries of Time and Spirit: The Letters of H. P. Lovecraft and Donald Wandrei
 Lovecraft Letters Volume 2: Letters from New York
 From Ohio University Press:
 H. P. Lovecraft: Lord of a Visible World An Autobiography in Letters edited by S.T. Joshi and David E. Schultz
 From Penguin Classics:
 The Call of Cthulhu and Other Weird Stories
 The Thing on the Doorstep and Other Weird Stories
 The Dreams in the Witch House and Other Weird Stories
 From Sporting Gentlemen:
 Against Religion
 From The Palingenesis Project:
 Supernatural Horror in Literature
 From Arcane Wisdom:
 The Crawling Chaos and Others: The Annotated Revisions and Collaborations of H.P. Lovecraft, Volume 1
 Medusa's Coil and Others: The Annotated Revisions and Collaborations of H.P. Lovecraft, Volume 2
 Interactive for iPad, The Call of Cthulhu

General and cited sources

Citations

External links
 
 

 
Lovecraft, H. P.
Bibliographies of American writers
Horror fiction bibliographies